The Polychrome Historic District is a national historic district in the Four Corners neighborhood in Silver Spring, Montgomery County, Maryland.  It recognizes a group of five houses built by John Joseph Earley in 1934 and 1935. Earley used precast concrete panels with brightly colored aggregate to produce the polychrome effect, with Art Deco details.  The two-inch-thick panels were attached to a conventional wood frame.  Earley was interested in the use of mass-production techniques to produce small, inexpensive houses, paralleling Frank Lloyd Wright's Usonian house concepts.

References

External links

, including photo in 2003, at Maryland Historical Trust
Boundary Map of the Polychrome Historic District, Montgomery County, at Maryland Historical Trust

Houses on the National Register of Historic Places in Maryland
Art Deco architecture in Maryland
Four Corners, Maryland
Historic districts on the National Register of Historic Places in Maryland
Houses in Montgomery County, Maryland
Historic American Buildings Survey in Maryland
National Register of Historic Places in Montgomery County, Maryland